was one of the administrative divisions of Korea under Japanese rule, with its capital at Taiden. The province consisted of modern-day South Chungcheong, South Korea.

Population

Number of people by nationality according to the 1936 census:

 Overall population: 1,482,963 people
 Japanese: 26,314 people
 Koreans: 1,454,830 people
 Other: 1,819 people

Administrative divisions

The following list is based on the administrative divisions of 1945:

Cities

 Taiden (大田) - (capital): Daejeon (대전). present Daejeon Metropolitan City.

Counties

 Daitoku (大德): Daedeok (대덕). present Daedeok District and Yuseong District in Daejeon Metropolitan City.
 Enki (燕岐): Yeongi (연기). present Sejong City.
 Kōshū (公州): Gongju (공주).
 Ronzan (論山): Nonsan (논산).
 Fuyo (扶餘): Buyeo (부여).
 Josen (舒川): Seocheon (서천).
 Honei (保寧): Boryeong (보령).
 Seiyō (靑陽): cheongyang (청양).
 Kōjō (洪城): Hongseong (홍성).
 Reizan (禮山): Yesan (예산).
 Zuizan (瑞山): Seosan (서산).
 Tōshin (唐津): Dangjin (당진).
 Gazan (牙山): Asan (아산).
 Ten'an (天安): Cheonan (천안).

Provincial governors

The following people were provincial ministers before August 1919. This was then changed to the title of governor.

See also
South Chungcheong Province
Provinces of Korea
Governor-General of Chōsen
Administrative divisions of Korea

Korea under Japanese rule
Former prefectures of Japan in Korea